Pierre Girard (born 2 August 1926) is a Swiss competitive sailor and Olympic medalist. He won a bronze medal in the 5.5 Metre class at the 1960 Summer Olympics in Rome, together with Henri Copponex and Manfred Metzger.

References

External links

1926 births
Living people
Swiss male sailors (sport)
Sailors at the 1960 Summer Olympics – 5.5 Metre
Olympic sailors of Switzerland
Olympic bronze medalists for Switzerland
Olympic medalists in sailing
Medalists at the 1960 Summer Olympics
20th-century Swiss people